Ayew is a surname. Notable people with the surname include:

 Abédi Ayew, better known professionally as Abedi Pele (born 1964), Ghanaian footballer
 Ibrahim Ayew (born 1988), Ghanaian footballer
 André Ayew (born 1989), Ghanaian footballer
 Jordan Ayew (born 1991), Ghanaian footballer
 Kwame Ayew (born 1973), Ghanaian footballer